The Battle of Kvistrum or the Battle of Kvistrum bridge took place on September 29, 1788, during the Theatre War, a phase of the Russo-Swedish War (1788–90), between Sweden and the Denmark–Norway. The Swedes lost the battle and had five killed and the rest captured with 60 wounded, the Danes and Norwegians had suffered 5 killed and 16 wounded.

References

Kvistrum
1788 in Europe
Kvistrum
Kvistrum
Kvistrum
Kvistrum